The New Bedford Gas and Edison Light Complex is a historic district at 180 MacArthur Drive in New Bedford, Massachusetts. It consists of two buildings: a power generation facility that served the New Bedford area for most of the 20th century, and a historic 19th century iron foundry building. Both are on a property once owned by NSTAR, the local electric utility, on the New Bedford waterfront. The foundry building is a utilitarian three story structure built out of granite, which was built in 1856 for the Taber & Grinnell Iron Foundry. Its initial construction was in 1916, and it was repeatedly enlarged until 1950. It was built by the New Bedford Gas & Electric Light District, and generated power for the city until 1992. In 2002 it was under consideration for use as an aquarium; but these plans failed. The complex was vacant in 2012.

The complex was listed on the National Register of Historic Places in 2002.

See also
National Register of Historic Places listings in New Bedford, Massachusetts

References

Historic districts in Bristol County, Massachusetts
New Bedford, Massachusetts
National Register of Historic Places in New Bedford, Massachusetts
Historic districts on the National Register of Historic Places in Massachusetts